Puck is the codename of two fictional characters appearing in American comic books published by Marvel Comics. The two characters are a father and daughter pair, who are both members of Alpha Flight, in the Marvel Universe.

Publication history
The first Puck debuted in Alpha Flight #1 (Aug 1983) and was created by John Byrne. He had intended for the original Puck to be a dwarf with no superhuman powers, merely great fighting and acrobatic skills; subsequent writer Bill Mantlo retconned Puck's small stature as being due to mystical influences. Byrne commented on this, stating, "Of course, [Mantlo] then went on to do the 'origin' of Puck, with the whole 'demon inside' thing being based, apparently, on the single reference Puck had made to being in constant pain, something which Bill failed to grasp was an effect of the condition — achondroplasty, called by name in the same issue that referenced the pain — which caused Puck's dwarfism." Byrne has also stated that Puck was based "very, very loosely on a friend who was short (but not as short as Puck) and occasionally bald, but never possessed by demons."

The second Puck debuted in Alpha Flight vol. 3 #1 and was created by Scott Lobdell and Clayton Henry.

Fictional character biography

Puck (Eugene Judd)

The first character to use the codename is a man whose real name is Eugene Milton Judd. He was born in 1914 in Saskatoon, Saskatchewan. He spent years traveling the world as a soldier of fortune, working as an intelligence agent and bouncer, before becoming a professional adventurer and joining Alpha Flight.

Early in his career, Judd was hired to steal the Black Blade of Baghdad. The Blade imprisoned an ancient sorcerer called Black Raazer, and Judd accidentally freed him.  Judd was able to trap Raazer using some ancient mysticism and the light from his own life force. This caused the 6'6" tall adventurer to shrink to about 3'6" in height, as the Black Blade had the ability to take life force from others, which caused a physical reduction in size. It has also granted him immortality. At some point, he became friends with the American playboy Dan Kane, otherwise known as Captain Terror. When Captain Terror was defeated in the Spanish Civil War by the 1930s El Aguila, a fellow hero fighting on the opposite side, he retired, but Puck fought El Aguila for revenge. He also formed a friendship with noted author Ernest Hemingway and became an accomplished bullfighter. He was paroled into Beta Flight and, eventually joining Alpha Flight, he adopted the codename "Puck."

Some details of his past remain unknown, hinted at in dialogue: the affair of the Brass Bishop, and some murders.

Puck was wounded by teammate Marrina and hospitalized. While recovering, he battled an illegal drug ring that was operating out of the hospital. Before long, he returned to active duty, and battled Omega Flight. Puck comforted Heather Hudson after James Hudson's presumed death. Puck then encountered the Sub-Mariner, and allied with the Sub-Mariner in battle against the Master.

Puck later journeyed to the realm of the Great Beasts alongside Alpha Flight, where they battled the Great Beasts. Puck encountered the Beyonder, and battled the Hulk during the events of Secret Wars II.

During his time with Alpha Flight, he encountered a new city deep in the Arctic Circle. There his team and the X-Men discovered a mystical wellspring. Several humans associated with the X-Men had gained vast powers via the wellspring. Puck was cured of his dwarfism by the well-intentioned Madelyne Pryor. He discovered a problem with walking because his center of balance was off. Later, the group discovered that the powers came at a price too high to bear, such as the loss of all creativity among all affected and the deaths of all mystics. This includes Puck's friend Shaman. The group splits along ideological lines, and both groups battle for some time before turning on the main threat. This turns out to be the trickster god Loki was behind all this. He was eventually persuaded to remove all effects of the well, which unfortunately included Puck's new height. A thought balloon indicated that the pain associated with his dwarfism was now worse than ever.

Soon after, Puck's background was revealed, and he battled Black Raazer who temporarily freed himself from the prison of Puck's body. He told his teammates about his past, and then took Raazer back into his body once more. He had romantic interest in Heather Hudson, but she instead turned to their teammate Madison Jeffries. Puck later encountered the Avengers.

When Northstar and Aurora both fell deathly ill (him physically and her mentally), Alpha Flight took them to the site of the Firefountain that Loki previously used to grant powers and wishes. Loki led them to a dark fountain instead (emanating from a deep pit), and sent dark elves to attack them. During the resulting fight, Puck is knocked into the fountain. Raazer was freed from Puck's body, returning Puck to his normal size and actual age even as he fell to what should have been his death. Loki instead teleported Puck to Tibet, and decided to abandon his previous life. Later, Puck became embroiled in a battle between Tibet and mainland China. He fought the Dreamqueen alongside Alpha Flight and was captured by her as the rest of the team was sent elsewhere. After being tortured by the Dreamqueen for a time, he was rescued by Alpha Flight and taken to the hospital to heal the injuries the Dreamqueen inflicted. Shaman injects Puck with a serum derived from his own blood and the mutative properties of a formula created by the Master. The serum was designed to repair Puck's body, but it was from his dwarf state. It reshaped him into his dwarf form and gave him the power to harden his skin to near invulnerability. He rejoined Alpha Flight with his new power.

Later, during the events of the Infinity Crusade, Puck was brainwashed and taken by the cosmic powered villain the Goddess. He was paired up with the affected Spider-Man when an invasion force of free-minded superheroes plan to attack the Goddess' fortress. This specific pairing was intended to teach Spider-Man brutality in the face of his 'former' friends. Puck was swiftly taken out of the fight, defeated by Firestar. Due to the effects of the resulting clash, all brainwashed heroes were later freed.

Puck was brainwashed again by members of his own government, who desired to have an Alpha Flight completely under their control. Puck fought with this new team for a while and was one of the few to be relatively successful against the mental mind games.

Along with Major Mapleleaf, Puck II, Vindicator, and Shaman, Puck was among the Alpha Flight members to be apparently killed by The Collective. Only Sasquatch was confirmed to have survived.

When Wolverine has been trapped in Hell by unknown forces, Puck and an unknown person are seen there, with the unknown person claiming to just want to talk to Wolverine, but Puck planning on finding a way to get both Wolverine and himself out of hell. Puck tells Wolverine to fight through the pain he feels while being tortured, implying that it will make the devil look weak and cause an uprising in hell, thus giving them a chance to escape. After the Devil is beaten, Puck attempts to escape along with Wolverine, but falls from the walls of hell which he was scaling when another condemned one grabs his foot and yanks him off and back into the pit. Though he remains in Hell, he wins the scrum for the Devil's sword, thus making him the ruler of Hell, at least for the time being.

During the Fear Itself storyline, Puck was shown to have escaped from Hell when he arrives to rescue Guardian from Vindicator (who betrayed the team to Gary Cody and his newly elected Unity Party, later revealed to be under the control of the Master of the World) and stated that he had escaped from Hell after his fight with Ba'al.

It has been announced that Puck will be a member of the relaunched Uncanny X-Force team alongside Storm, Psylocke and Spiral.

When Elizabeth Twoyoungmen was introduced to Alpha Flight, Puck became her physics instructor. Much later at the time of a mass Wendigo outbreak, the two have become lovers.

As part of the All-New, All-Different Marvel event, Puck appears as a member of the Alpha Flight space program.

Puck (Zuzha Yu)

Zuzha Yu was a mutant who worked at a bar near McGill University in Montreal and was supposedly the daughter of the original Puck. She agreed to join the reformed Alpha Flight after losing an arm-wrestling match with Walter Langkowski, alias Sasquatch.

At the end of the series the prologue explains that she and Major Mapleleaf have children.

She was one of the members of Alpha Flight apparently killed by The Collective.

Powers and abilities
Originally, Puck had no superhuman powers, relying on his exceptional training and his amassed worldly knowledge. He was a formidable hand-to-hand combatant, capable of a mixture of various martial arts, street-fighting techniques, acrobatics and gymnastics. After a run-in with The Master of the World his body was subject to genetic manipulation of his cellular structure. His body tissues were condensed at a molecular level, causing his body to become akin to compressed rubber. His trademark attack is a cartwheeling motion. Spinning on his hands and feet at great speeds, he is able to slam into and knock down human-sized enemies with ease. He is also skilled in bullfighting. He has some knowledge of mysticism, enough to once trap Black Raazer, and the ability to put himself in a temporary deathlike trance state. Puck is about half the size of the average man. His condition causes him varying amounts of constant pain. Also, his aging has been stopped or vastly slowed; Judd resembles a man in his thirties. His right ear is misshapen, presumably due to an old injury (see cauliflower ear).

Zuzha had superhuman strength, speed, reflexes, agility, coordination, endurance, and could redirect kinetic energy. She was an excellent hand-to-hand combatant.

Other versions

Earth X
In this alternate future, Puck is seen as one of the many heroes in the afterlife. They all rally to fight the forces of Mephisto and Thanos, in an attempt to stop their genocidal plans.

Marvel Zombies
In the Marvel Zombies comics set in the universe of Earth-2149 the zombified Alpha Flight attack the X-Men and are eventually killed by Magneto. Puck is pictured in the foreground of a large panel depicting Alpha Flight attacking the X-Men and Puck is apparently attacking Nightcrawler.  Puck is destroyed moments later by Magneto.

Marvel Noir
Puck (Eugene Judd) is Captain Logan's first mate in X-Men Noir.

In other media

Television
 The original Puck appeared in the X-Men episode "Repo Man" voiced by Don Francks.

Toys
In 1999, Toy Biz released an action figure of Puck in its Snowbird/Puck two-pack.{{Action Figure Realm|July 2021}}
In 2013, Hasbro released an action figure of Puck in its Marvel Universe line (Wave 21).
In 2013, Puck was the BAF (Build a Figure) in a Wolverine Legends wave which was exclusive to Diamond.
In 2019, Puck was shown as part of a Marvel Legends Alpha Flight set, an Amazon exclusive, which also includes Vindicator, Shaman, Northstar, Aurora, and Snowbird. This figure is the complete version of the Build A Figure from 2013.

Video games
 Puck appears as enemy in Marvel Super Heroes: War of the Gems.
 Puck appears as 4★ playable Character in Marvel Puzzle Quest.

Name
 A letters page in Alpha Flight seemed to confirm that Judd is named after the Shakespearean character. However, in a FAQ dated 5/30/2006, John Byrne has stated that he is named after a hockey puck.

References

External links
 AlphaFlight.Net Alphanex Entry on - Puck
 AlphaFlight.Net Alphanex Entry on - Puck II
 Puck I at Marvel.com

Articles about multiple fictional characters
Canadian superheroes
Canadian-themed superheroes
Characters created by John Byrne (comics)
Characters created by Scott Lobdell
Comics characters introduced in 1983
Comics characters introduced in 2004
Fictional bodyguards
Fictional characters from Montreal
Fictional characters from Saskatchewan
Fictional characters with dwarfism
Fictional mercenaries in comics
Marvel Comics characters who can move at superhuman speeds
Marvel Comics characters with superhuman strength
Marvel Comics female superheroes
Marvel Comics martial artists
Marvel Comics mutants
Marvel Comics mutates
Marvel Comics superheroes